The GREAT Campus is a science technology park located on the Erzelli hill in Genoa, in northwest Italy. The park is partly under ongoing construction and partly already working. At the moment, it hosts several high tech corporations such as Ericsson, Siemens, and Esaote, in addition to a robotics laboratory of the Istituto Italiano di Tecnologia (IIT) and other companies.

In 2026, the GREAT Campus will host the new Faculty of Engineering of the local Università di Genova.

History

The foundation

In the early 2000s, a group of entrepreneurs and managers gathered in the Ligurian Dixet association, constitute the Genova High Tech S.p.A. company aimed precisely to the realization of the technology park.
The company is led by Carlo Castellano, CEO of Esaote S.p.A., and Giuseppe Rasero, former director of the Institute for Industrial Reconstruction (IRI).
Your company has, among others, shares of Intesa Sanpaolo, Banca Carige, Aurora Construction, Coop Liguria, Prometheus srl, Talea S.p.A. and EuroMilano S.p.A.

The construction

The Erzelli is an area about 0.44 km2 wide located in Genoa between the neighborhoods of Sestri Ponente and Cornigliano. It was created by clipping the top of the Monte Guano and using the resulting material for the construction of the Genoa Cristoforo Colombo Airport. Thanks to a major urban improvement project, it is set to house the Erzelli Science and Technology Village which will give the city of Genoa an innovative high technology, research, training and business center. It is destined to change Genoa's image while giving the city a 100 thousand square metre park with many facilities and 200 thousand square meters of green areas along the slopes of Monte Guano. Sports, leisure and entertainment facilities will be set up here.

The Master Plan

The Master Plan foresees that some 70% of the Village will be used for high tech and training/education with around 200 businesses established, 15,000 new users including 5,000 students and the creation of at least 6,000 jobs for highly qualified persons. The residential areas will be developed in the most scenic locations and shall be close to parks and facilities. Genoa University Faculty of Engineering, buildings for high tech businesses, urban village/park, recreation facilities, commercial services, residences for students and researchers.
These high technology companies are relocated in the Erzelli park:

 Ericsson (May 2012)
 Talent Garden (December 2013)
 Siemens (January 2014)
  Alten Italia (March 2016)
  Enega (March 2016)
  Esaote (May 2016)
 IIT - Istituto Italiano di Tecnologia (December 2016)
 Liguria Digitale (Regione Liguria) (March 2017)
 Liguria Innovation Exchange (July 2020)

See also
 University of Genoa
 Italian Institute of Technology
 Artificial Intelligence Exposition | C1A0 EXPO in Genoa

References

External links
 Great-Campus.it - official website
  Talent Garden Genoa

Science and technology in Italy